The De la Gardie family (also de la Gardie) is the name of a distinguished Swedish noble family of French origin.

History
The family's social status in France is uncertain; the founder, Ponce d'Escouperie, son of a tradesman, came to Sweden as a mercenary in 1565 and took the name Pontus De la Gardie when registered by the House of Knights. He was given the title friherre in 1571 and married Sofia Johansdotter Gyllenhielm, an illegitimate daughter of king John III in 1580.

The baronial title ended with his eldest son John De la Gardie. Pontus De la Gardie's second son, Jacob De la Gardie, was given the title count of Läckö in 1615; his grandson Magnus Gabriel De la Gardie became a favourite of Queen Christina and married her cousin, Countess Palatine Maria Eufrosyne of Zweibrücken (a sister of Charles X Gustav of Sweden).

The De la Gardie of Läckö comital lineage is extinct. The current head of the family, Carl Gustaf De la Gardie (1946– ), lives outside Linköping.

Members
Notable members include:

 Pontus De la Gardie (1520–1585), Governor of Swedish Estonia (1574–1575) and (1583–1585), married Sofia Johansdotter  Gyllenhielm, illegitimate daughter of John III of Sweden
 Jacob De la Gardie (1583–1652), son of Pontus, led Swedish army to Moscow.
 Johan De la Gardie (1582–1642), Governor of Swedish Estonia 1626-28)
 Magnus Gabriel De la Gardie (1622–1686), Swedish statesman, son of Jacob.
 Maria Sofia De la Gardie (1627–1694), industrialist
 Axel Julius De la Gardie (1637–1710), Swedish field marshal, son of Jacob.
 Johanna Eleonora De la Gardie (1661–1708), lady-in-waiting, poet
 Magnus Julius De la Gardie (1668–1710), Swedish general and statesman, son of Axel.
 Brita Sophia De la Gardie (1713–1797), amateur actress, culture personality
 Catherine Charlotte De la Gardie (1723–1763), heroine
 Eva Ekeblad née Eva De la Gardie, (1724–1786), scientist
 Hedvig Catharina De la Gardie (1732–1800), daughter of Magnus Julius, wife of Axel von Fersen the Elder and mother of Axel von Fersen the Younger.
 Hedvig Ulrika De la Gardie (1761–1832), lady-in-waiting

See also
De la Gardie Campaign

References

External links

Ancestry.com De la Gardie
The De la Gardie Archive Swedish historic documents and family archives at Lund University Library

Swedish noble families
De la Gardie family
Swedish families of French ancestry